, translated variously as The Rustic Genji, False Murasaki and a Country Genji, or A Fraudulent Murasaki's Bumpkin Genji, is a late-Edo period Japanese literary parody of the Tale of Genji by Murasaki Shikibu.

The parody shifts the time-frame from the Heian period to the Muromachi period, and replaces inserted waka poetry with haiku.

The plot centres on the outlandish adventures of Ashikaga Mitsuuji, second son of Ashikaga Yoshimasa, while seeking to recover a stolen sword, mirror, and poem, upon which the security of the realm depend. The preface to the first chapter introduces the character Ōfuji, whose nickname is Murasaki Shikibu. In the preface to the tenth chapter, Tanehiko describes his own literary project: When I first began to write The Rustic Genji an aged friend said to me: "You should try to the best of your ability to preserve the language of the original and not alter the story. It will probably then be of some use to young people who haven't read The Tale of Genji." But a young friend said, "You should vary the plot. Weave in effects from Kabuki and the puppet theatre. Surely there can't be anyone who hasn't read Genji."

See also

 The Dog Pillow
 E-hon
 Imperial Regalia of Japan

References

Further reading

The Tale of Genji
Edo-period works
Literary parodies